Gonadopause may refer to:

 Menopause
 Andropause

References

Developmental stages